Dar Tabligh (دار السلام تبلف) is a sub-committee of the Khoja Shi'a Ithnasheri Jamaat of Dar es Salaam, Tanzania.  

Its activities include
Release of weekly Friday Supplement
Running of Husayni Madrasah
Publishing Islamic books

It is supported by the Al-Itrah Foundation.

External links
Official Website

Organisations based in Tanzania